HMS Annan was a  built for the Royal Navy but was transferred to the Royal Canadian Navy before commissioning. She served with the Royal Canadian Navy during the Second World War and saw action primarily as a convoy escort in the Battle of the Atlantic. She was returned to United Kingdom following the war and quickly sold to Denmark, who renamed the vessel Niels Ebbesen. She was primarily used as a training vessel until 1963 when she was broken up in Odense. She was named for the River Annan in Scotland in UK and Canadian service and Niels Ebbesen in Danish service.

Construction and service
Annan was ordered by the Royal Navy on 26 December 1942 and laid down on 10 June 1943 by Hall, Russell & Co. Ltd. at their shipyard in Aberdeen, Scotland. The vessel was launched on 29 December 1943 and was handed over to the Royal Canadian Navy for commissioning as HMCS Annan on 13 January 1944 at Aberdeen.

After working up at Tobermory, Annan joined escort group EG 6 at Londonderry. With this group she patrolled and escorted convoys in coastal waters around the United Kingdom. Forced to surface, the submarine was sunk by Annan by depth charge. Annan rescued forty-six survivors from the U-boat.

In April 1945, the group EG 6 was transferred to Halifax, Nova Scotia. However the following month, Annan returned to the United Kingdom and was handed back to the Royal Navy at Sheerness on 20 June 1945.

Post-war service
Annan was sold to the Royal Danish Navy on 22 November 1945 as one of two River-class frigates. The two ships were renamed the Holger Danske class. Annan was renamed Niels Ebbesen for the Danish squire Niels Ebbesen. She was used as a training ship for naval cadets, carrying up to 90 trainees. Niels Ebbesen went through several refits during her service with the Royal Danish Navy. She was decommissioned on 8 May 1963 and broken up that year at Odense, Denmark.

References

Notes

Footnotes

References
 
 
 Rohwer, Jürgen (2005). Chronology of the War at Sea 1939–1945: The Naval History of World War Two (Third Revised ed.). Annapolis, Maryland: Naval Institute Press.

External links

 

Ships of the Royal Canadian Navy
1943 ships
Ships built in Aberdeen
River-class frigates of the Royal Navy
Battle of the Atlantic
Training ships
Ships of the Royal Navy